Christopher William Bristow (2 December 1937 – 19 June 1960) was a British Formula One driver. Bristow was the son of a garage owner from London, and was unmarried. Bristow was called the "wild man of British club racing", as he had spun or had collisions on almost every race track on which he had raced. He started four Formula One World Championship races and scored no championship points.

He was killed during the 1960 Belgian Grand Prix at the very fast Spa-Francorchamps circuit, in warm, dry, sunny conditions. Bristow wrecked his Yeoman Credit Racing Cooper T51 at the Burnenville corner on lap twenty while fighting to stay in front of the Ferrari of Willy Mairesse.

Bristow and Alan Stacey died in close proximity and within a few minutes of one another. They both crashed at Burnenville, the same extended fast right hand bend at which Stirling Moss had been severely injured the previous day. Cars regularly sped through the Burnenville corner at 120 miles per hour. There was a four-foot embankment there and barbed wire in the meadow about ten feet back from the road. Bristow's Cooper hit the bank and rolled over; he was hurled into the barbed wire, which decapitated him.

With regard to Bristow's unruly driving style, a friend of his said after the accident, "We all knew this was going to happen. It does no good to say now, but Chris simply did not have the experience to drive that way in Grand Prix racing."

The winner of the annual Autosport BRDC Award for promising young British drivers is also presented with the Chris Bristow Trophy.

Complete Formula One World Championship results
(key)

Non-championship results
(key) (Races in bold indicate pole position)
(Races in italics indicate fastest lap)

References

External links
 

1937 births
1960 deaths
English racing drivers
English Formula One drivers
British Racing Partnership Formula One drivers
Racing drivers who died while racing
Deaths by decapitation
Sport deaths in Belgium